Wayne Martin Jones (July 28, 1954 – November 23, 2019) was an American politician and member of the Ohio House of Representatives. He died in 2019 from Parkinson's disease.

References

Democratic Party members of the Ohio House of Representatives
2019 deaths
1954 births